The Manchester Suburban Tramways Company (MSTC) was set up in 1877 to provide horse-drawn tram services throughout Manchester and Salford, in England. The company's first tram service, which was also a first for Manchester, ran on 17 May 1877. The MSTC was merged with the Manchester Carriage Company in 1880 to form the Manchester Carriage and Tramways Company. The initial board of directors comprised Daniel Busby, William Turton, John Greenwood (1818-86), and Benjamin Whitworth.

See also
History of public transport authorities in Manchester
Manchester Corporation Tramways

References

Citations

Bibliography

Tram transport in Greater Manchester
British companies disestablished in 1880
1877 establishments in England
Transport companies established in 1877
British companies established in 1877
1880 disestablishments in England
Horse-drawn railways
Tram transport
Transport companies disestablished in 1880